
Gmina Strawczyn is a rural gmina (administrative district) in Kielce County, Świętokrzyskie Voivodeship, in south-central Poland.

The gmina contains part of the protected area called Suchedniów-Oblęgorek Landscape Park.

Villages
Gmina Strawczyn contains the villages and settlements of Bugaj, Chełmce, Hucisko, Korczyn, Kuźniaki, Małogoskie, Niedźwiedź, Oblęgór, Oblęgorek, Promnik, Ruda Strawczyńska, Strawczyn and Strawczynek.

Neighbouring gminas
Gmina Strawczyn is bordered by the gminas of Łopuszno, Miedziana Góra, Mniów and Piekoszów.

References
 Polish official population figures 2006

Strawczyn
Kielce County